Polkowice Dolne  is a district (osiedle) of the town of Polkowice, in the administrative district of Gmina Polkowice, within Polkowice County, Lower Silesian Voivodeship, in south-western Poland. Formerly a village, it was incorporated within the town limits of Polkowice in 2005.

During World War II, a German forced labour subcamp of the prison in Jawor was operated in the settlement.

References

Neighbourhoods in Poland